Rising Star Academy is a private Islamic day school for students in pre-K through twelfth grades, located in Union City, in Hudson County, New Jersey, United States, established in 2009.

As of the 2019–20 school year, the school had an enrollment of 216 students (plus 21 in PreK) and 29.9 classroom teachers (on an FTE basis), for a student–teacher ratio of 7.2:1. The school's student body was 55.6% (120) Black, 41.2% (89) White and 3.2% (7) Hispanic.

History
Rising Star Academy opened in September 2009 by the North Hudson Islamic Educational Center, a Sunni Muslim mosque established in 1992 in Union City. The mosque's 2,000-member congregation includes approximately 500 Latino converts from other religions, such as Catholicism.

The school received accreditation from the Middle States Association of Colleges and Schools Commissions on Elementary and Secondary Schools in May 2016 and is accredited untilJuly 2024.

References

External links

"Rising Star Academy". Private School Review.

2009 establishments in New Jersey
Educational institutions established in 2009
Islamic schools in New Jersey
Private elementary schools in New Jersey
Private middle schools in New Jersey
Private high schools in Hudson County, New Jersey
Union City, New Jersey